Ambalal Sarabhai (23 February 1890 – 13 July 1967) was an Indian industrialist, philanthropist, institution builder, and supporter of Mahatma Gandhi. He was the chairman and promoter of Calico Mills and the founder of The Sarabhai Group of Companies. He also was a participant in Indian independence movement.

After Gandhi decided to admit an untouchable family in his Kochrab Ashram, Mangaldas Girdhardas decided to stop his funding to his ashram. At this time, Sarabhai decided to fund this Ashram and gave ₹13000 to Gandhi, which was two year's expenses.

See also 

 Sarabhai family

References

 Basu Aparna, As Times Change. Sarabhai Foundation, 2018. p 115, 123, 124
 M. V. Kamath & V. B. Kher, The Story of Militant But Non-Violent Trade Unionism. Navajivan Trust. 1993. p 37
 Edwin Mortimer Standing, Indian Twilight. Bharati Sarabhai Charity Trust. 1967.
 Howard Spodek, Ahmedabad: Shock City of Twentieth-Century India. Orient Blackswan Private Limited. 2012. p 37, 38, 39, 40, 121–139.
 Erikson, Erik H. Gandhi's Truth: On the Origins of Militant Nonviolence. Faber and Faber Limited. 1970. p 296–303.
 Amrita Shah, Vikram Sarabhai: A Life. Penguin Books. 2016. p 6–13, 27, 29, 40, 45, 54, 66, 77–78, 91, 93, 99–100, 102, 104, 141, 164, 210.
 Kenneth L. Gillion. Ahmedabad: A Study In Indian Urban History. University of California Press Berkeley and Los Angeles. 1968. p 86,87, 170
 Dwijendra Tripathi and Makarand Mehta. Business Houses in Western India: A Study in Entrepreneurial Response 1850- 1956. Manohar Publications. 1990. p 92
 Tirthanker Roy. A Business History of India: Enterprise and the Emergence of Capitalism from 1700. Cambridge University Press. 2018. p 146, 171, 192
 Amrita Shah. Ahmedabad: A City in the World. Bloomsbury Publishing India. 2015
 Kalia,Ravi. Gandhinagar: building national identity in postcolonial India. University of South Carolina. 2004. p 43–45, 50, 51, 53.

Businesspeople from Ahmedabad
People from Vadodara
1890 births
1967 deaths
People from Gujarat
Recipients of the Kaisar-i-Hind Medal
Indian businesspeople in textiles
Gandhians
Indian philanthropists
Indian independence activists from Gujarat
Founders of Indian schools and colleges
Gujarati people
Sarabhai family
Jain Indian independence activists